Shōko, Shoko or Shouko (written: 翔子, 聖子, 祥子, 荘子, 抄子, 渉子, 昌子, 昌己, 尚子 or 匠子) is a feminine Japanese given name. Notable people with the name include:

, Japanese singer, television personality and actress
, Japanese lyricist
, Japanese speed skater
, Japanese speed skater
, Japanese singer, actress and television personality
Shoko Hamada (disambiguation), multiple people
, Japanese writer
, Japanese singer
, Japanese figure skater
, Japanese voice actress
, Japanese women's footballer
, Japanese idol
, Japanese ice hockey player
, Japanese Paralympic athlete
, Japanese singer-songwriter
, Japanese table tennis player
, Japanese volleyball player
, Japanese actress and voice actress
, Japanese handball player

Fictional characters
, a character in the light novel series Baka and Test
Shoko Nishimiya, the female protagonist in the manga series and the movie A Silent Voice
Shoko Makinohara, one of the main characters in the series Rascal Does Not Dream of Bunny Girl Senpai
Shoko Komi, the female protagonist in the manga series Komi Can't Communicate
Shōko Ieiri, a supporting character in the series Jujutsu Kaisen
Shōko Hirugami, the elder sister of Sachirō Hirugami, a character in Haikyū!!
Shōko Nadami, a character in AI: The Somnium Files
Shoko Hida, a character in Happy Sugar Life

Japanese feminine given names